Ubayd is an Arabic given name and surname, a variant romanization of the same name also written Ebeid, Obeid, etc.

It may refer to:

Given name
 Ubayd Zakani, Persian poet and satirist of the 14th century
 Ubayd Allah al-Mahdi Billah, leader of the Fatimids

Patronymic
 Amr ibn Ubayd, one of the earliest leaders in the "rationalist" theological movement of the Mu'tazilis

See also
 Ubayd Allah (disambiguation) and variants
 Ubaydul Haq (disambiguation) and variants
 Ubayda, Arabian tunbūr or pandore player and singer
 Al-Ubaid (disambiguation), for other uses and various romanizations of the same name